Tarek Salim (born Jun 23, 1983 is an Egyptian football striker.

In July 2015, he moved to Ittihad Alexandria.

External links
 

1983 births
Living people
Egyptian footballers
Association football forwards
El Raja SC players